Shane Toal (born 11 November 1995) is a Scotland international rugby league footballer who plays on the  or as a  for the Barrow Raiders in the Betfred Championship.

He was born in Barrow-In-Furness, Cumbria, England, and he is the younger brother of Daniel Toal.

Toal made his début for Scotland in 2015 against France. He was named in Scotland's 2017 Rugby League World Cup squad.

References

External links
2017 RLWC profile
Scotland profile
Scotland RL profile

1995 births
Living people
Barrow Raiders players
English rugby league players
English people of Scottish descent
Rugby league players from Barrow-in-Furness
Rugby league wingers
Scotland national rugby league team players